The Ambassador of the Republic of the Philippines to the United States is the Republic of the Philippines' foremost diplomatic representative in the United States of America. As head of the Philippines' diplomatic mission there, the Ambassador is the official representative of the President and the Government of the Philippines to the President and Government of the United States. The position has the rank and status of an Ambassador Extraordinary and Plenipotentiary and is based at the embassy located at the 1600 Massachusetts Avenue, Northwest in Washington D.C. within its Embassy Row. The Philippine ambassador to the United States is also accredited as non-resident ambassador to various Caribbean countries.

The position is currently held by Jose Manuel Romualdez since July 24, 2017.

Head of mission

See also 
 Philippines–United States relations
 List of ambassadors of the United States to the Philippines
 Resident Commissioner of the Philippines

Notes and References 

United States
Philippines